Coldwater River is a  stream in the U.S. state of Michigan. Flowing north and west, it is joined by the outflow from the Lake of the Woods and continues north for several miles. West of the city of Coldwater, it flows through a series of lakes: South Lake, Messenger Lake, Cemetery Lake, North Lake, Randall Lake, Morrison Lake, Craig Lake, and Hodunk Pond.

The Coldwater River drainage basin includes nearly the entire eastern half of Branch County and portions of Allen and Reading townships in western Hillsdale County.

Tributaries
Major tributaries (from the mouth):
 Hog Creek, flows into the Coldwater River at Hodunk, Michigan 
 North Branch Hog Creek, rises in section 23 of Butler Township
 South Branch Hog Creek, rises out of a complex of lakes in eastern Reading Township in Hillsdale County
 Bagley Creek, rises in Quincy Township just north of the village of Quincy
 Bowen Creek, rises in sections 31 and 32 in the southwest corner of Litchfield Township in Hillsdale County
 Little Hog Creek, rises section 2 in the northeast corner of Reading Township in Hillsdale County
 The outflow of Miller Lake in northeast Batavia Township
 A complex of lakes in Quincy, Algansee and Ovid Township, including Marble Lake, Middle Lake, Lake Bartholomew, Mud Lake, and Long Lake connect with Coldwater Lake to the south, which also forms the headwaters of the main branch of the Coldwater River
 Fisher Creek flows into Marble Lake and rises in sections one and two in northeast California Township
 Tallahassee Creek (Tallahassee Drain) flows into Mud Lake and rises in section 22 of California Township, just north of Ray

References 

Rivers of Michigan
Rivers of Branch County, Michigan
Tributaries of Lake Michigan